Sora is a small village and municipality in the comarca of Osona, Catalonia autonomous community, Spain.

Population History

References

External links 
Pàgina web de l'Ajuntament
 Government data pages 

Municipalities in Osona